Álvaro Zamith was a Brazilian sports administrator, who was the first president of the Brazilian Football Confederation, then called CBD (Confederação Brasileira de Desportos, or Brazilian Sports Confederation), from 20 November 1915 until 4 November 1916.

References 

Presidents of the Brazilian Football Confederation
Football people in Brazil